The 2013 Volvo World Match Play Championship was the 48th Volvo World Match Play Championship played. It was held 16–19 May, with the champion receiving €800,000. The format was 24 players split into eight pools of three, with the top two in each pool progressing to the knock-out stage. It was an official money event on the European Tour.

Graeme McDowell of Northern Ireland defeated Thongchai Jaidee of Thailand, 2 & 1, in the final.

Course

Format
The 24 players were split into eight pools of three, with the top two in each pool seeded by their Official World Golf Ranking and the remaining eight randomly assigned to a pool. Within each pool, every player played each other in a round-robin format over 18-hole matches. Points were awarded based upon win (2), tie (1) or loss (0). The two leading players from each pool advanced to the knock-out stage. In case of ties, sudden-death playoffs were used to determine rankings.

Participants

Pool play
Round 1, 16 May
Round 2, 17 May, morning
Round 3, 17 May, afternoon

Source

1st – McDowell
2nd – Wood
3rd – Gallacher

1st – Jaidee
2nd – Aiken
3rd – Poulter

1st – Lowry (Lowry takes first place with birdie on second extra hole.)
2nd – Hanson (Hanson takes second place with par on second extra hole.)
3rd – Coetzee

1st – Sterne
2nd – Van Pelt
3rd – Ogilvy

1st – Grace
2nd – Colsaerts
3rd – Aphibarnrat

 
1st – Molinari
2nd – Aguilar
3rd – Stenson

1st – Jamieson
2nd – Pettersson
3rd – Olesen

1st – Fernández-Castaño
2nd – Rumford
3rd – Donaldson

Playoffs
Source

Prize money breakdown
Source:

Notes and references

External links
Official site
Coverage on the European Tour's official site

Volvo World Match Play Championship
Golf tournaments in Bulgaria
Volvo World Match Play Championship
Volvo World Match Play Championship
Volvo World Match Play Championship